The Baldwin School (simply referred to as Baldwin School or Baldwin) is a private school for girls in Bryn Mawr, Pennsylvania, United States. It was founded in 1888 by Florence Baldwin.

The school occupies a 19th-century resort hotel designed by Victorian architect Frank Furness, a landmark of the Philadelphia Main Line. The building was added to the National Register of Historic Places on April 27, 1979.

Baldwin's brother school is the Haverford School, in nearby Haverford.

History
In 1888, Florence Baldwin founded "Miss Baldwin's School for Girls, Preparatory for Bryn Mawr College" in her mother's house at the corner of Montgomery and Morris Avenues in Bryn Mawr, Pennsylvania. The first class was composed of thirteen girls.

 The second Bryn Mawr Hotel was designed by Furness, Evans & Company and built in 1890–91. It is a five-story, "L" shaped stone-and-brick building in a Renaissance Revival / châteauesque style.  It features a large semi-circular section at the main entrance, topped by a conical roof and finial. It has a steeply pitched red roof with a variety of dormers, chimneys, towers, finials, and skylights.

In 1896, The Baldwin School began leasing the Bryn Mawr Hotel during the winter months for use as a dormitory for its boarding students. They leased it year-round beginning in 1912. In 1922, the school purchased the building and the surrounding  for $240,000.

Today the school has made many additions to "The Residence", as it is called, but has maintained the elegance of the original building. It is now used for the dining hall, many art studios, a black box, apartments for faculty and staff, music classes, and an Early Childhood Center. It also has many lounge areas for students and others.

A two-story science building opened in 1961; it was enlarged in 1995 to accommodate the increasing number of students. The Upper and Middle Schools inhabit the three-story Schoolhouse, which was built in 1926. It was renovated in 1997. The Middle School on the third floor was renovated again in the summer of 2018.

Grades 1-5 are housed in the Lower School building, which was completed in 1974. Changes have been made, for instance, painting the walls bright colors, to make it a warmer learning environment for the younger girls.

Renovations completed in 2014 to "The Residence" specifically support the Pre-Kindergarten and Kindergarten classes. In 2015, a performing arts center was built called The Simpson Center, which can be used for many different events.

The school formally opened a new athletic center in 2008. It has a six-lane swimming pool, gymnasium, three-lane jogging track, 4 squash courts, fitness center, and multipurpose meeting/activity space, as well as five tennis courts and a practice field.

Student body
Students of color represent 40% of the student body. The Baldwin School is not religiously associated.

Arts

Music

Baldwin's music education begins in the Lower School. Students receive twice weekly music classes and sing in weekly choruses in Grades 3–5. Students perform in musical plays once a year. In Middle School, chorus, orchestra and classes in guitar and hand bell are available. In Upper School, ensembles include a jazz band, classical chamber music ensemble Firenze, two hand bell choirs, chorus, select a cappella vocal ensemble Baldwin B-Flats, select singing ensemble Eliza-B-thans and an orchestra. Each ensemble is featured during multiple evening concerts throughout the year.

The Middle School Chorus participates annually in the Music in the Parks competition at Hershey Park in May. At the 2014 competition, the Middle School Chorus received a Superior rating and the Best Overall Middle School Chorus trophy for their performances. Every three years, the Upper School ensembles take a week and a half performance tour to a destination abroad. Past destinations include Vienna, Austria; Tuscany, Italy; Budapest, Hungary; Stockholm, Sweden; Oslo, Norway; and Copenhagen, Denmark.
 
The Baldwin Conservatory offers weekly private instruction on piano, voice, violin, viola, flute, clarinet, saxophone, oboe, trumpet, trombone, guitar, ukulele, banjo and harp. The Baldwin Conservatory has had many accomplished musicians as faculty including pianist and composer Jean Paul Kürsteiner.

Athletics
The Baldwin School competes in the Inter-Academic League, most commonly known as the Inter-Ac. Interscholastic varsity sports are: Basketball, Cross-Country, Field Hockey, Golf, Lacrosse, Rowing, Soccer, Softball, Squash, Swimming and Diving, Tennis, Volleyball, and Indoor Track. Dance is also offered, and students also have the option of Independent PE if they are seriously committed to a sport outside of school such as horseback riding or ice skating, or any sport included in Baldwins program. Athletes who do participate in IPE are required to play their sport for Baldwin during the season if it is an offered sport. PE is another option, which is during the school day, for either 45 or 70 minutes.

Baldwin is especially strong in tennis, softball, squash, and lacrosse, whose teams regularly travel to the Pittsburgh, New York, and Baltimore areas for heightened competition. The Baldwin Bears have recently been Inter-Ac champions in softball, lacrosse, and squash. Its longtime local rival has been the Episcopal Academy in Newtown.

The Baldwin School's athletic center features an indoor track, swimming pool, multiple locker rooms, team meeting room, fitness center, dance studio, squash courts, and basketball court. The building features solar reflective roofing, regionally sourced materials, Energy Star equipment and appliances, and an indoor air quality management system.

Squash
Baldwin is best known for its squash program. Each class regularly consists of a couple nationally ranked squash players, many of whom compete internationally across Europe, Canada, and South America. Several Baldwin Squash alumni have gone to play the sport at various Ivy League schools. Many of these players are also among the strongest academically at Baldwin, earning honors including National Merit and induction into the Cum Laude Society.

Baldwin's longstanding rival in squash has been Greenwich Academy in Connecticut. In 2015, the upper school team defeated Greenwich in the US Squash Championships at Trinity College. The school's middle school team won the national championship against Greenwich in 2016 and 2018. The upper school team again faced Greenwich in the 2018 national championships, but lost 1–6. However, in 2019, Baldwin was able to defeat Greenwich 5–2 in the national championships. This ended a 3-year streak of Greenwich being the reigning national champions.

Notable alumnae

Bertha Adkins (1924) – Undersecretary of Health, Education, and Welfare, Chairman of the Federal Council on Aging, Organizer of the White House Council on Children and Youth, Maryland Women's Hall of Fame Inductee, Executive Director of the Women's Division of the *Republican National Committee
Ruth Davidon (1982) – rower, 1996 Summer Olympics and 2000 Summer Olympics
Louise Dolan (1967) - Mathematical Physicist and Professor of Physics, University of North Carolina at Chapel Hill, Fulbright Scholar, Harvard University Junior Fellow, Guggenheim Fellow, Maria Goeppert-Mayer Award of the American Physical Society
Gertrude Sumner Ely (1895) - twice-decorated by the French for distinguished bravery under fire, past president of the Pennsylvania League of Women Voters, member of the executive committee for UNICEF and the World Affairs Councils of America
Henrietta H. Fore (1966) – first woman Administrator of the United States Agency for International Development (USAID) and Director of U.S. Foreign Assistance, 37th Director of the United States Mint in the U.S. Department of Treasury, Presidential Appointee for President George H. W. Bush at the U.S. Agency for International Development
Jody Gerson (1979) – Chairman and CEO of Universal Music Publishing Group, co-president of Sony/ATV Music Publishing, responsible for signing Lady Gaga, Alicia Keys and Norah Jones, producer of Drumline and ATL, executive producer of Drumline: A New Beat
Alice Goffman sociologist
Farah J. Griffin (1981) – author, Professor at Columbia University, New York Public Library Cullman Center for Scholars and Writers fellow
Trish Hall (1968) – The New York Times Op-Ed and Sunday Review editor
Leslie Lyness (1986) - US women's field hockey midfielder, 1996 Summer Olympics
Andrea Lee (1970) - writer and novelist
Helen Taft Manning (1908) – daughter of President William Howard Taft, Dean of Bryn Mawr College, Distinguished Daughter of Pennsylvania, suffragette
Martha Nussbaum (1964) – author, first woman Junior Fellow at Harvard University, Ernst Freund Distinguished Service Professor of Law and Ethics at the University of Chicago, Founding and Past President of the Human Development and Capability Association, Past President of American Philosophical Association, Central Division
Margaret Robinson (1969) - Professor of Molecular Cell Biology at Cambridge Institute for Medical Research at University of Cambridge, Fellow of the Royal Society
Cornelia Otis Skinner (1918) – author of Our Hearts Were Young and Gay, film and Broadway actress
Asali Solomon - Author and academic
Katrina Ely Tiffany (1893) - suffragist in New York City
Anne Cabot Wyman (1948-2014) - journalist, first female editorial page editor of The Boston Globe, Pulitzer Prize for Public Service, Pulitzer Prize for Editorial Writing finalist
Marjorie Yang (1970) - non-official member of the Executive Council of Hong Kong, chairperson of the Esquel Group, independent non-executive director of HSBC, Swire Pacific and Novartis AG, Fortune Magazine's Top 50 Most Powerful Women in International Business
Kinney Zalesne (1983) – General Manager of Corporate Strategy at Microsoft, Counsel to U.S. Attorney General Janet Reno, White House Fellow, Assistant District Attorney for the City of Philadelphia

References

External links

 
Main Line Today magazine
Petersen's Private Secondary Schools
National Coalition of Girls' Schools
National Association of Independent Schools
History of the Main Line

Lower Merion Township, Pennsylvania
Renaissance Revival architecture in Pennsylvania
Private elementary schools in Pennsylvania
Private middle schools in Pennsylvania
Private high schools in Pennsylvania
Girls' schools in Pennsylvania
Schools in Montgomery County, Pennsylvania
Philadelphia Main Line
Frank Furness buildings
Hotel buildings on the National Register of Historic Places in Pennsylvania
National Register of Historic Places in Montgomery County, Pennsylvania
School buildings completed in 1891
Educational institutions established in 1888
1888 establishments in Pennsylvania